For the river with the same name, see Manambolo (disambiguation)

Manambolo is a town and commune in Madagascar. It belongs to the district of Maroantsetra, which is a part of Analanjirofo Region. The population of the commune was estimated to be approximately 13,000 in 2001 commune census.

Primary and junior level secondary education are available in town. The majority 95% of the population of the commune are farmers.  The most important crops are rice and vanilla, while other important agricultural products are coffee and cloves.  Services provide employment for 5% of the population.

References 

Populated places in Analanjirofo